The CANT Z.516 was a three engine monoplane floatplane designed in Italy at the start of  World War II.  It did not go into service.

Design and development
The Z.516 (Z denoting a Zappata design) was the result of a 1939 requirement for an improved version of the established CANT Z.506 reconnaissance bomber, which was a three engine aircraft. Work on the aircraft began in early 1940. The project was managed by the designer Filippo Zappata. It was decided to use the fuselage and power plant of a well-tested Z.1007 Alcione bomber for the construction of a seaplane. The first flight of the aircraft took place on 3 August 1940. However, the flight characteristics did not satisfy the Regia Aeronautica and work on the aircraft was stopped.

Specifications

See also

References

Z.0516
Floatplanes
1940s Italian bomber aircraft
Low-wing aircraft
Aircraft first flown in 1940